SS Harold Dossett was a Liberty ship built in the United States during World War II.

Construction
Harold Dossett was laid down on 26 December 1944, under a Maritime Commission (MARCOM) contract, MC hull 2399, by J.A. Jones Construction, Brunswick, Georgia; she was sponsored by Mrs. L.A. Graves, and launched on 30 January 1945.

History
She was allocated to the Norton Lilly Management Agency, on 15 February 1945. On 23 December 1947, she was laid up in the National Defense Reserve Fleet, in the Hudson River Group. On 24 June 1953, she was withdrawn from the fleet to be loaded with grain, she returned loaded on 6 July 1953. On 23 April 1957, she was withdrawn to be unload, she returned on empty 1 May 1957. On 9 July 1958, she was withdrawn from the fleet to be loaded with grain, she returned loaded on 25 July 1958. On 4 March 1959, she was withdrawn to be unload, she returned on empty 10 March 1959. On 19 November 1960, she was withdrawn from the fleet to be loaded with grain, she returned loaded on 29 November 1960. On 26 February 1963, she was withdrawn to be unload, she returned on empty 1 March 1963. On 8 September 1970, she was sold for $90,500 to Eckhardt & Co., G.m.b.H., West Germany, to be scrapped. She was removed from the fleet on 16 September 1970.

References

Bibliography

 
 
 
 
 

 

Liberty ships
Ships built in Brunswick, Georgia
1945 ships
Hudson River Reserve Fleet